P. caesius may refer to:
 Penstemon caesius, the San Bernardino beardtongue, a plant species endemic to California, United States
 Praealticus caesius, a combtooth blenny species found in the western central Pacific Ocean

See also 
 Caesius (disambiguation)